John Dorman may refer to:

John J. Dorman, Fire Commissioner of the City of New York
John Henry Dorman (1843–1921), American Civil War soldier and Medal of Honor recipient
John "Doc" Dorman (died 1963), American football coach